Fern Ferguson (born c.1925) was an All-American Girls Professional Baseball League player. She was from Whalen, Missouri.

Career
Ferguson joined the Racine Belles club in the 1945 season and was assigned as a pitcher. She posted a 4.90 ERA in 11 innings of work, allowing 10 runs (six earned) on 12 hits and nine walks without strikeouts and did not have a decision. Additional information is incomplete because there are no records available at the time of the request.

Recognitions and awards
In 1988 was inaugurated a permanent display at the Baseball Hall of Fame and Museum at Cooperstown, New York, that honors those who were part of the All-American Girls Professional Baseball League. Fern Ferguson, along with the rest of the girls and the league staff, is included at the display/exhibit.

Sources

All-American Girls Professional Baseball League players
Racine Belles (1943–1950) players
Date of birth missing
Place of birth missing
Possibly living people
Year of birth uncertain